Francis Wheatley may refer to:

Francis Wheatley (painter) (1747–1801), English portrait and landscape painter
Francis Wheatley (VC) (1821–1865), English soldier and Victoria Cross winner